Samofalovka is a rural locality (a settlement) and the administrative center of Samofalovskoye Rural Settlement, Gorodishchensky District, Volgograd Oblast, Russia. The population was 1,877 as of 2010. There are 27 streets.

Geography 
Samofalovka is located in steppe, 27 km northwest of Gorodishche (the district's administrative centre) by road. Grachi is the nearest rural locality.

References 

Rural localities in Gorodishchensky District, Volgograd Oblast